Dongdaesan is a mountain located in Daean-dong, Buk-gu, Ulsan, South Korea. On the top of a mountain is a 2.5 meter tall monument that reads "Our wish is reunification" (우리의 소원은 통일), referring to the reunification of the Korean peninsula.

See also
Dongdaesan (disambiguation)
Geography of Korea
List of mountains in Korea
List of mountains by elevation
Mountain portal
South Korea portal

References

Mountains of Ulsan
Mountains of South Gyeongsang Province
Buk District, Ulsan
Mountains of South Korea